is a novel written by Japanese poet and filmmaker Sion Sono, based on his Suicide Club trilogy. It was published by Kawade Shobō Shinsha in 2002.

Plot summary

Suicide Circle: The Complete Edition tells in four different chapters the story behind a fictional mass suicide that takes place on the Shinjuku Station in 2002, on which 54 high school girls throw themselves in front of a train. This event unleashes in Japan—and soon after, in the world—a chain of suicides that seems endless. Police officers try to stop it and understand why this is happening, and after several events they find a connection between the suicides and a website that belongs to a mysterious organization called Family Circle.

Through this website, Family Circle enrolls young people and incite them to run away from home to serve the Circle "family rentals", a service that the organization provides to families who lost relatives to suicide. Parallel to this, alongside the police's quest, the book also follows the story of one of Family Circle's new members who witnessed the mass suicide, Noriko Shimabara, and how her own family slowly falls apart to the suicide wave, while her father tries to "rescue" her from the Circle. In the end, all the pieces come together as the true meaning behind the website is revealed.

Major theme
The book deals mostly with the theme of suicide, and the high teenage and Internet suicide rates in Japan, but also connects suicide with family and the generation gap between parents and children in modern society. It is also concerned with the nature of happiness, the perception of reality, and uses the figure of the circle to represent various philosophies.

Film
Kanzenban was written by Sion Sono in order to give insight in the philosophy of suicide for his planned Suicide Club trilogy, and to intertwine the stories of these movies.

 Suicide Circle
 Noriko's Dinner Table

See also

External links
 Sion Sono's official site
 Sion Sono's statement on the novel

2002 Japanese novels
Thriller novels
Dystopian novels
Kawade Shobō Shinsha books